Phultala Junction railway station is a railway junction in Bangladesh, situated in the Phultala Upazila of Khulna District. It was originally part of the Eastern Bengal State Railway during the British Raj. Phultala Jn is the take off point for the Khulna–Mongla Port Railway.

References

External links 

Transport in Khulna
Railway stations in Khulna District
Buildings and structures in Khulna